Kataksha is 2019 Pakistani psychological horror film. The film features Saleem Meraj, Kiran Tabeir, Kasim Khan, Nimra Shahid and Mubeen Gabol. Kataksha is written and directed by Abu Aleeha.

Synopsis
Four colleagues encounter problems while on a road trip to make a television documentary.

Cast 
 Saleem Mairaj
 Kiran Tabeir
 Kasim Khan
 Nimra Shahid
 Mubeen Gabol

Production
This film has been directed by Abu Aleeha.

Production team
Director & Producer: Abu Aleeha
Editor: Muhammad Muneeb
Color Grading: Sheikh Moin Ud Din 
Cinematographer: Junaid Mehmood
Background Music: Bilal Allah Ditta / Ali Allah Ditta.

Release
The film was released on 21 June 2019.

Box office
The film recorded the good opening in Pakistan despite limited shows. This film collected Rs.10.7 million in the first weekend.
In first 10 days film earned 19.3 million rupees.

Accolades
 Kataksha will be shown at the London FrightFest Film Festival in August 2019.

See also
 Cinema of Pakistan
 Lollywood
 List of highest-grossing Pakistani films
 List of Pakistani films of 2019

References

External links 
 

2010s Urdu-language films
2019 films
Lollywood films
Pakistani horror films
2019 horror films
Films directed by Abu Aleeha